Drumcreen, Northern Ireland is a locality and townland in Northern Ireland. The townland of Drumcreen is 123.37 acres in area. Drumcreen is in the civil parish of Magheracross, Barony of Tirkennedy. and County Fermanagh.

Drumcreen has a rich history.

References

Townlands of County Fermanagh